Si Tú Me Miras (If You Look at Me) is the third studio album recorded by Spanish singer and songwriter Alejandro Sanz, It was released by WEA Latina on August 17, 1993. where he counted with the collaboration of musicians Paco de Lucía (in the tracks "El Escaparate" and "Mi Primera Canción") and Nacho Mañó (in the album production). In this album appear tracks as "Si Tú Me Miras" and others in which the author begins to appreciate a musical evolution. The official singles of the album were "Si Tú Me Miras" and "Cómo Te Echo de Menos", and he shot videos for both songs.

Track listing

 "Si Tú Me Miras" – 4:17
 "Tu Letra Podré Acariciar" – 3:38
 "El Escaparate" – 4:47
 "Cómo Te Echo de Menos" – 4:01
 "Cuando Acabas Tú" – 4:03
 "Mi Primera Canción" – 4:38
 "Vente al Más Allá" – 4:00
 "Qué No Te Daría Yo" – 3:36
 "Este Pobre Mortal" – 3:35
 "A Golpes Contra el Calendario" – 5:02

Personnel

 Miguel Ángel Arenas – producer
 Mike Brittain – double bass
 Stuart Brooks – trumpet
 Ben Cruft – violin
 Chris Davies – saxophone
 Paco de Lucía – Spanish guitar courtesy of PolyGram Iberica
 Mike de Saulles – violin
 Alan Douglas – engineer
 David Emmanuel – viola
 Jon Evans-Jones – violin
 Roger Garland – violin
 Wilf Gibson – violin
 Tim Grant – viola
 Mark Haley – assistant engineer
 Brian Hawkins – viola
 John Heley – cello
 Ian Ross of Bill Smith Studio – cover design
 Garfield Jackson – viola
 Paul Kegg – cello
 Boguslav Kostecki – violin
 Chris Laurence – double bass
 Helen Liebmann – cello

 Martin Loveday – cello
 Rita Manning – violin
 Nacho Mañó – producer, director
 Jim McLeod – violin
 Perry Montague-Mason – violin
 Pete Oxer – violin
 Pablo Pérez Minguez – photography
 Tony Pleeth – cello
 Jorge Represa – photography
 Eddie Saeta – photography
 Alejandro Sanz – vocals
 Neil Sidwell – trombone
 Steve Sidwell – trumpet
 Bob Smissen – viola
 John Thirkell – trumpet
 Phil Todd – saxophone
 Justin Ward – viola
 Mark Warner – assistant engineer
 Barry Wilde – violin
 Gavin Wright – violin

Re-release

Si Tú Me Miras (Edición 2006) is the re-release of the album Si Tú Me Miras containing a CD and DVD. The CD contains 13 tracks and the DVD contains 6 videos.

Track listing

CD
 "Si Tú Me Miras" – 4:14
 "Tu Letra Podré Acariciar" – 3:34
 "El Escaparate" – 4:46
 "Cómo Te Echo de Menos" – 4:00
 "Cuando Acabas Tú" – 4:01
 "Mi Primera Canción" – 4:36
 "Vente al Más Allá" – 3:56
 "Qué No Te Daría Yo" – 3:34
 "Este Pobre Mortal" – 3:36
 "A Golpes Contra el Calendario" – 5:02
 "Tu Letra Podré Acariciar (Versión Básico)" – 3:31
 "Com um Olhar (Si Tú Me Miras)" – 4:16
 "Rumba (Lo Que Te He Escrito Yo) (Demo)" – 3:40

DVD

 "Cómo Te Echo de Menos" (video)
 "Si Tú Me Miras" (video)
 "Mi Primera Canción" (from the Básico concert)
 "Qué No Te Daría Yo" (from the Básico concert)
 "Cómo Te Echo de Menos" (from the Básico concert)
 "A Golpes Contra el Calendario" (from the Básico concert)

Album certifications

References

1993 albums
Alejandro Sanz albums
Spanish-language albums
Warner Music Latina albums